"Calling (Lose My Mind)" is a single by Swedish house producers Sebastian Ingrosso (of Swedish House Mafia) and Alesso featuring American recording artist Ryan Tedder of OneRepublic. It was released in Sweden on 13 March 2012 and in the UK on 27 May 2012. American recording artist Matthew Koma assisted the artists in writing the song. The original instrumental version of the track was released on 31 August 2011, under the name "Calling". The song topped the Billboard Hot Dance Club Songs chart and was also a top-ten hit in Australia and the UK. It was featured on Swedish House Mafia's second compilation album Until Now, released on 22 October 2012.

Chart performance

Weekly charts

Year-end charts

Certifications

References

2012 singles
2012 songs
Alesso songs
Sebastian Ingrosso songs
Songs written by Ryan Tedder
Songs written by Sebastian Ingrosso
Songs written by Matthew Koma
EMI Records singles
Songs written by Alesso
Song recordings produced by Alesso
Song recordings produced by Sebastian Ingrosso